Santa Tecla Fútbol Club is a Salvadoran multi-sport club based in Santa Tecla since being formed in 2007. Although they compete in a number of different sports, Santa Tecla is mostly known for its professional association football team.
The club has competed in Primera División de Fútbol de El Salvador, the nation's top tier, since being promoted there for Apertura 2012.
Santa Tecla was founded in 2007, and currently plays its home games at the 10,000 capacity soccer-specific Estadio Las Delicias.

History
Santa Tecla Fútbol Club was formed in 2007 as a means for the "Tecleños" citizens to support a local team. It had been almost 40 years since the demise of former league champions Quequeisque.

They took over the Telecom FC licence and made their debut in professional football in the 2007–08 season. During their first competitive season, the team managed to reach the quarterfinals of the tournament.

Promotion to La Primera
Santa Tecla won their first title in 2012, winning the 2012 Apertura second division title by defeating Brasilia 2–1. A week later Santa Tecla defeated Titán (the champion of the 2011 Clausura title) 2–1 with goals by William Maldonado and Roberto González, allowing for Santa Tecla to be promoted to the Primera División de Fútbol de El Salvador (La Primera) for the first time in club history.

Champions
In 2015, the club had its most successful period in its history under the guidance of Argentinian Osvaldo Escudero. The club were able to win their first championship (the Clausura 2015) in club history. Santa Tecla won on a penalty shootout 3–1 after the match finished 1–1; William Maldonado was the lone goal-scorer for Santa Tecla in the final.

Second championship
Santa Tecla finished in third place in the regular season, advancing to the 2016 Apertura Playoffs, where they met Isidro Metapan in the first round. They drew the first leg 2–2, but Santa Tecla won the second leg at TBD, to win 3–2 on aggregate. Santa Tecla faced the Aguila in the semi-final, winning 4–3 on aggregate to advance to La Primera's championship game. Santa Tecla faced the Alianza F.C. for the championship. Santa Tecla won 3–2 on a game-winning brace by Sebastian Abreu in the second half, with Gerson Mayen scoring the other goal in the first half, thus winning their second title in La Primera.

Third championship
Santa Tecla finished in third place in the regular season, advancing to the 2017 Clausura Playoffs, where they met C.D. FAS in the first round. They drew the first leg 0–0, but Santa Tecla won the second leg at Estadio Las Delicias 1–0, to win 1–0 on aggregate. Santa Tecla faced the Aguila in the semi-final, winning 5–2 on aggregate to advance to the championship game. Santa Tecla faced the Alianza F.C. for the championship for the second straight tournament. Santa Tecla once again won La Primera's championship title with a comprehensive 4–0 victory, with Marlon Cornejo, Gerson Mayen William Canales and Carlos Bueno.

Contenders and Fourth championship 
Following their third La Primera championship, the team made two consecutive finals (Apertura 2017 and Clausura 2018) against Alianza F.C., losing 4–1 and 1–0 respectively. During that period they were coached by Argentinian Ernesto Corti and Uruguayan Ruben da Silva.
On 16 December 2018, Santa tecla won their fourth La Primera championship, defeating their rival Alianza F.C. 2–1 thanks to a double from Wilma Torres. The title end their recent losses and dominance by Alianza in the finals.

Stadium

 Estadio Las Delicias (2007–present)
 Estadio Jorge "Mágico" González; San Salvador (2012) played in TBD during Estadio Las Delicias renovation.
 Estadio Universitario UES; San Salvador (2019) played in Clausura 2019 during Estadio Las Delicias renovation.
 Estadio Cuscatlán; San Salvador (2019–2020) played in Clausura 2019 during Estadio Las Delicias renovation and again in Apertura 2020 due to dispute with INDES the owner of the stadium.
 Estadio Anna Mercedes Campos; Sonsonate (2023-) played in Clausura 2023 during Estadio Las Delicias renovation

Santa Tecla Fútbol Club has forged its entire history, from 2007 to the present, in the Estadio Las Delicias, but during stadium renovations they played their matches in the Estadio Jorge "Mágico" González and Estadio Universitario UES.

Sponsorship
Companies that Santa Tecla FC currently has sponsorship deals with for 2023–2024 includes:
 Maca – Official Kit Suppliers
 Tigo – Official sponsors
 Sudagrip – Official sponsors
 Electrolit – Official sponsors
 Sistema Fedecredito – Official sponsors
 Los Toros – Official sponsors
 Vermex – Official sponsors
 Plaza Merlot – Official sponsors
 Auditaxes – Official sponsors

Honours

Domestic honours

Leagues
 Primera División de Fútbol de El Salvador and predecessors 
 Champions (4) : Clausura 2015, Apertura 2016, Clausura 2017, Apertura 2018
 Segunda División Salvadorean and predecessors 
 Champions (1) : Clausura 2012

Cups
 Copa El Salvador and predecessors 
 Champions (2) : 2016–17, 2018–19

Minor Cups
 Jaguar Sportic Cup 
 Champions (1) : 2015–16

Current squad
As of February 5, 2023.

In

Out

Coaching Staff 2023

Coaching staff

Personnel

Management

Reserve team
Santa Tecla's youth squad plays in the twelve-team Primera División Reserves (El Salvador). Current members of the squad are: As of February 2023.

Presidential history

List of notable players

Captains

Players with 50 or more goals/appearances for Santa Tecla
Includes competitive appearances only.
Current players in bold

  Ricardinho (207 games, 80 goals)
  Juan Barahona (190 games)
  Gerson Mayen	(180 games)
  Marlon Cornejo (148 games)
  Bryan Tamacas (153 games)
  Joel Almeida	(139 games)
  Alexander Mendoza (130 games)
  Gilberto Baires (113 games)
  Facundo Simioli (83 games)
  Rodrigo Rivera (74 games)

List of coaches
Santa Tecla has had 19 permanent managers since it first appointed Armando Contreras Palma as coach in 2007. The longest serving manager was Osvaldo Escudero, who managed Santa Tecla for two years from May 2014 to May 2016. Edgar Henríquez "Kiko" won the club's first title, winning the Segunda División title in 2011, while Osvaldo Escudero "El Pichi" won the club's first Primera División de Fútbol de El Salvador (La Primera) title in 2015. This was followed by Ernesto Corti, who coached then to a second (2016) and third (2017) consecutive La Primera titles. Corti also won Copa El Salvador in 2017. Argentinian Christian Díaz made it four consecutive with the 2018 Apertura title.

Club records

 First victory for Santa Tecla 2–1 Once Municipal, 6 August 2012
 Record League victory: 8-0 v Pasaquina, Primera division, 14 February 2016
 Record League Defeat: 1-7 v Alianza, Primera division, 22 July 2012

International level 
 As of 24 January, 2023

League season performance
Primera División de Fútbol de El Salvador (La Primera): Apertura 2012 – Clausura 2022

Other departments

Football

Reserve team
The reserve team serves mainly as the final stepping stone for promising young players under the age of 21 before being promoted to the main team. The second team is coached by Francisco Medrano (footballer). the team played in the Primera División Reserves, their greatest successes were winning the Reserve championships in Clausura 2017, Apertura 2017, Clausura 2019 and Apertura 2021.

Junior teams
The youth team (under 17 and under 15) has produced some of El Salvador's top football players, including TBD and TBD.

Women's team
The women's first team, which is led by head coach TBD, features several members of the El Salvador national ladies team. Their greatest successes were reaching the semi finals the in Apertura 2020.

Other sports
Santa Tecla has other departments for a variety of sports.

Basketball
 
Santa Tecla Básquetbol Club was founded on 2015 and play Liga Mayor de Baloncesto (LMB) which is the highest level in El Salvador league tier. the club is led by head coach TBD, the club features several key members including Puerto Rican Bryan Vásquez and TBD. Their greatest successes were winning the 2016 Clausura, 2018 Clausura, 2019 Apertura

Baseball
Santa Tecla Béisbol Club was founded on 2016 and play Liga Nacional de Béisbol (LNB)  which is the highest level in El Salvador league tier. the club is led by head coach Venezuelan Jesús Cartagena, the club features several key members including Puerto Rican Bryan Vásquez and TBD. Their greatest successes were reaching the TBD

Volleyball
Santa Tecla Voleibol Club was founded on 2016 and play  Campeonaro Nacional which is the highest level in El Salvador league tier. the club is led by head coach TBD, the club features several key members including TBD and TBD. Their greatest successes were reaching the TBD

References

External links
 
 

Football clubs in El Salvador
2007 establishments in El Salvador
Association football clubs established in 2007